Samuel Thabo Ramosoeu (né Maposa; born 15 August 1982) is a South African-born, Botswanan footballer who plays as a midfielder for Liga de Elite side Hang Sai.

Career statistics

Club

Notes

References

1982 births
Living people
Botswana footballers
Botswana international footballers
Association football forwards
Bidvest Wits F.C. players
Winners Park F.C. players
Windsor Arch Ka I players
Botswana expatriate footballers
Botswana expatriate sportspeople in Namibia
Expatriate association footballers in New Zealand
Expatriate footballers in Namibia
Expatriate footballers in Macau
Expatriate footballers in England